The Kedron Brook is a creek that flows through the northern suburbs of Brisbane in the south-east region of Queensland, Australia.

Course and features
Formed by spring D'Aguilar Range within the southern portion of the D'Aguilar National Park, Kedron Brook rises below the  retail shopping strip, near the outer suburb of Upper Kedron and flows in an easterly direction.

For much of its length, Kedron Brook is lined with parks and sporting facilities such as bikeways and football fields. Kedron Brook has been channelised where it passes suburbs such as Lutwyche and Wooloowin. Tidal influence reaches as far as Toombul.

History

Kedron Brook was named by the German missionary group which established German Station (now Nundah) in March 1838. It is named after Kidron Valley near Jerusalem.

The original course of Kedron Brook has been significantly altered in the vicinity of Brisbane Airport, where it has been redirected to a canal named the Schulz Canal. This was done to allow expansion of the airport in recent decades. The canal empties into Moreton Bay adjacent to the small bayside village of Nudgee Beach. At the lower end of the catchment, Boondall Wetlands is an internationally recognised habitat (Ramsar site) for migratory wader birds and other animals in Moreton Bay.

Kedron Brook flooded during the 2022 Brisbane floods.

Gallery

See also

References

External links

Kedron Brook Catchment Network

Geography of Brisbane
Rivers of Brisbane